Kumbalangi Nights is a 2019 Indian Malayalam-language drama film directed by Madhu C. Narayanan. The directorial debut was written by Syam Pushkaran and jointly produced by Fahadh Faasil and Nazriya Nazim under their production house Fahadh Faasil and Friends, in association with Dileesh Pothan and Syam Pushkaran under Working Class Hero. The film stars Shane Nigam, Fahadh Faasil,  Soubin Shahir, and Sreenath Bhasi, along with newcomers Anna Ben, Grace Antony and Mathew Thomas in pivotal roles.   The cinematography and editing were handled by Shyju Khalid and Saiju Sreedharan, respectively. The soundtrack and background score is composed by Sushin Shyam.

Set in the eponymous fishing village of Kumbalangi in Kochi, Kerala, the film centres on the strained relationship between four brothers living together in a dysfunctional home, and how they ultimately stand up for each other as a family. Pushkaran came up with the idea for the film based on the time he spent in the village in his twenties. In 2011, he discussed the story with then-assistant director Narayanan, who decided to make his directorial debut with it. By 2016, Faasil and Pothan, both of whom had worked closely with Narayanan and Pushkaran on previous films, had agreed to co-produce the film. Narayanan then spent a year in Kumbalangi to understand its culture better, before shooting began in September 2018.

The film was released in India and GCC territories on 7 February 2019. It received universal critical acclaim, and has been listed by several publications as one of the best Malayalam films of the decade. The film also achieved considerable commercial success at the box office, grossing ₹39 crore worldwide, against a budget of ₹6.5 crore and gained cult status. It was premiered on 24 May 2019 at the Habitat International Film Festival in Delhi, and also at the International Film Festival of Kerala where it won the NETPAC Award for Best Malayalam Film (Special Mention). It won several awards, including three Asianet Film Awards, six Vanitha Film Awards, four Kerala State Film Awards, seven CPC Cine Awards and two SIIMA Awards. Faasil's character "Shammi" also developed a cult following with many of his dialogues becoming popular.

Plot
Saji, Bonny, Bobby and Frankie are four brothers living in a small, dilapidated house in the village of Kumbalangi. Saji's father had married Bonny's mother, who then gave birth to Bobby and Franky. When their father dies, the mother abandons the boys to join a religious mission, leaving Saji to be the man of the house. Saji has anger management issues, and often gets into fights with Bobby, an unemployed youngster. Franky is ashamed of Saji and Bobby but gets along well with Bonny, who is mute and kind.

Bobby starts dating Baby, a girl who lives nearby. He eventually proposes to her, but she asks him to talk to her family first. Bobby asks Saji to accompany him, and together they go to meet Shammi, Baby's brother-in-law. Shammi rejects the proposal and ridicules the poor reputation that Bobby's family has among the villagers. Saji tries to console Bobby and asks him to get a job, which he does.

One day, a fight breaks out between Saji and Franky. Bonny, who is very protective of Franky, hits Saji. Ashamed, Saji leaves the house and takes to drinking with his friend Vijay. In his drunken stupor, Saji tries to commit suicide. Vijay loses his own life in process of saving Saji's life

As a result of his remorse, Saji goes to Vijay's house to Apologize to Sathi, only to find her in Labor. He takes her to the hospital, where she gives birth to a baby girl. Saji takes Sathi and her daughter to his house. Meanwhile, Bonny has brought home an American tourist, Nylah, who has been kicked out of her homestay run by Shammi, for inviting Bonny there. Franky is pleased to have the two women in the house, as it gives them some semblance of being a regular family. Bobby even tries to enliven their love lives with suggestions like asking Bonny to take Nylah out to see sea sparkle's at night.

Sometime later, Saji approaches Shammi again and asks him to reconsider the proposal, which Shammi refuses. Baby makes up her mind to elope with Bobby. However, Shammi finds out about Baby's plans, and turns abusive and violent. He assaults Baby, her sister and their mother, holding them captive in their own home. When Baby fails to return his calls, Bobby gets anxious and decides to check up on her. Bobby's brothers volunteer to help, and the four arrive at Baby's house. Together, they manage to trap Shammi with a fishing net and set the women free. Bobby and Baby are finally reunited and get married.

Cast 

 Shane Nigam as Bobby Napoleon
 Fahadh Faasil as Shammi Sreenivasan
 Soubin Shahir as Saji Napoleon
 Sreenath Bhasi as Bonny Napoleon 
 Mathew Thomas as Franky Napoleon
 Anna Ben as Baby Mol
 Grace Antony as Simmy, Shammi's wife
 Sooraj Pops as Prasanth, Bobby's friend
 Ramesh Thilak as Murugan aka Vijay
 Jasmine Mètivier as Nylah
 Riya Saira as Sumeesha
 Baiju Ezhupunna as Tony, Baby and Simmy's Uncle
 Sheela Rajkumar as Sathi
 Ambika Rao as Baby and Simmy's Mother
 Ajith Moorkooth as Psychiatrist
 Ansal Palluruthy as Shyju
 Dileesh Pothan as Police Inspector Raju Unni (Cameo appearance)
 Lali PM as Mother to Bonny Napoleon, Bobby Napoleon & Franky Napoleon 
 Poli Sharath as Bar DJ

Production

Development

Writer Syam Pushkaran conceived the idea for the film by drawing inspiration from the time he spent with his friends in his twenties in the village of Kumbalangi, which was near his hometown. In telling the story, Pushkaran said he wanted to counter the negative stereotypes about the village and its people. Writing the script took around 5 years, during which time Pushkaran worked on other films as well, but the final draft was completed in around six months. Pushkaran clarified that the film was not based on any real-life incident or person and was a relatively difficult one to write. However, he has stated that the character of Saji was influenced by a man with suicidal tendencies he encountered in his village in his youth. In 2011, while he was co-writing Salt N' Pepper, Pushkaran discussed the idea with its assistant director Madhu C. Narayanan, who became interested in making it his directorial debut. In 2016, the pair worked together again on Thondimuthalum Driksakshiyum (2017), after which they decided to focus on getting Kumbalangi Nights made.

Casting
Fahadh Faasil played the brother-in-law of Baby who firmly opposed to the relationship between Baby and Bobby and ultimately goes to extreme measures to prevent them from being together. Through the character, director Narayanan aimed to depict the misogyny and toxic masculinity that passes for heroism in Kerala. When writer Pushkaran initially approached Faasil he had not expected that he would accept the role of the antagonist, explaining: "He was having a good run, doing successful family films. It was very courageous of him to agree to do this role." Shane Nigam was cast for the part early on in the production process. He played Bobby, the second-youngest brother who has been described by Nigam as a "lazy bum, someone who leads a responsibility-free life, and doesn’t have any serious, long-term plans." He turns his life around for the girl he falls in love with. In an interview, he said that he lived like his character for around three months to the point that he found it difficult to recognise himself after the filming was done, and struggled to move on to his next role, in the 2019 film Ishq.

Soubin Shahir was approached to play the role of Saji even before his breakthrough performance in Sudani from Nigeria (2018) for which he earned a State Film Award. The eldest of the four brothers, Saji is a wastrel who lives off the earnings of his hardworking migrant friend, and regularly gets into violent fights with his younger brothers. Writer Pushkaran said that the character was loosely based on a friend from his youth in Kumbalangi named Saji Napoleon, who had had suicidal tendencies. Sreenath Bhasi was initially offered the part of the Bobby. However, by the time the movie was slated to begin shooting, the directors thought he was more suitable as the older brother, Bonny. The oldest brother after Saji, Bonny is a mute who falls in love with an American woman who comes to Kumbalangi as a tourist. Bhasi described his character as "the grounded big brother" of the family. Mathew Thomas, a debut actor, was cast for the role after he was shortlisted from an audition held at his school. For the role of Franky, the youngest brother, he spent six months with the film crew in Kumbalangi, during which he learnt to cook, row boats, cast fishing nets and play football in the forward position.

Anna Ben played Baby, a determined young woman who has nursed a crush on Bobby since her school days and later dates him. Ben, an aspiring actress, responded to a casting call on Instagram for the movie and was subsequently selected through four rounds of auditions. She said she found it easy to identify with her character, explaining: "[Baby] is modern and traditional simultaneously, rooted, with her own point-of-view ... her clarity of thought, views on religion, and dialogues were all relatable. She sticks to her opinion, but isn’t arrogant." Grace Antony had made her debut appearance in Happy Wedding (2016), which made Pushkaran reach out to her for the movie. She played Simmy, Baby's older sister and Shammi's wife. A soft-spoken, traditional woman, Simmy is intimidated by her husband and speaks out against him only when he starts taunting Baby. Antony had also tried out for Baby's role, but was finally cast as Simmy. As her character was older to her, Antony said she imitated the mannerisms and body language of her mother and other housewives she observed for her performance.

Filming
Dileesh Pothan, who had directed Thondimuthalum Driksakshiyum, offered to produce the film during an ad shoot with Narayanan. The film ended up being the debut production of Pushkaran's and Pothan's newly formed production house, Working Class Hero. Meanwhile, Pushkaran discussed the film and the character of Shammi with actor Fahadh Faasil while they were working on Maheshinte Prathikaaram (2016). Faasil, who found the character "very layered and complicated", agreed to the part. Subsequently, he also decided to co-produce the film under the banner of Fahadh Faasil & Friends, the production company that he owned with his wife, actress Nazriya Nazim. Faasil had no qualms about producing a film by the debut director, as he had already worked closely with Narayanan, who was then an assistant director, on 22 Female Kottayam (2012). He explained his decision to co-produce the film, saying, "Meeting producers, convincing them, budgeting and more, takes a lot of time. I didn't want to go through any of that drill. Working with Syam [Pushkaran], Dileesh [Pothan] and the like is a fun experience and it's very dear to me, so I also wanted to give it my all."

Once the script and main cast was finalised, Narayanan rented a house in Kumbalangi and stayed there over a year to learn more about the place and local culture, leaving just two days before the shooting began. Many of the supporting actors were chosen during auditions held in the village itself. The four brothers’ house in the film was a set, built based on pictures of the interiors of different homes in the area. In order to give it a lived-in look, the crew collected used items and furniture from local households in exchange for fresh replacements. The algae in the surrounding water bodies were  grown by the crew, a process which took 10 to 15 days. The film also used special effects to recreate the bioluminescence caused by sea sparkle, often sighted in Kumbalangi's water bodies. The film graded using DaVinci Resolve. Filming began in early September 2018. On the long period it took to make the film, Narayanan said: "Considering the challenge that comes with a script populated by so many characters, we knew we had to approach everything patiently. Fleshing out all the characters and the surrounding details required a lot of time. All that preparation was needed just to get the entire story in a basic synopsis form."

Themes

Kumbalangi Nights has been described as a new generation film, a Malayalam cinema movement characterised by its progressive themes and realistic screenplays. The film critiques hypermasculinity and patriarchy, morality, primarily through the juxtaposition of Shammi and Saji's characters. Writing for The Hindu, Arjun Jai Singh commented that "both men have psychological issues, but when Saji comes close to the abyss, he realises he must help himself: he goes to a doctor to cry out his emotions. Meanwhile Shammi insists on being “a hero”." Neelima Menon of Firstpost opined that the film "not only succeeds in overthrowing the celebrated alpha male but also points out that in theory he is the villain of the story." Namrata Joshi summed up Shammi's character as "the acme of perverse and pathological masculinity that the film gets one up on."

The film has also been noted for its feminist undertones. Baby, Nylah, and the absent mother all exercise their free will and agency in their own lives – without a "knight in shining armor" – except, notably, when a man physically overpowers one of them. Isha Sengupta of The Indian Express pointed out how the onus of rehabilitating the grown men was not placed on the women, observing that they "serve as an incentive for the men and the situation at their household to change, and not agents who bring about it. They witness. They do not execute. [The men] take charge of their lives and mend their ties, as some enter the kitchen and some find their vocation."

Music

The film's soundtrack album and score was composed by music director Sushin Shyam, who also contributed vocals to three of its songs. The Malayalam lyrics on the album were penned by writers Anwar Ali and Vinayak Sasikumar, and the English lyrics by Shyam's bandmate, Nezer Ahemed. The album was launched on 21 January 2019 by Bhavana Studios. The song "Silent Cat", which in the movie is shown as a love song by an American tourist, was sung by German-based artist Kezia Quental, also known as K.Zia.

In an interview, Shyam said that he was influenced by Italian music while making the album, owing to the similarities he found between the city of Venice, and Kumbalangi. He also revealed that working on the soundtrack was a challenge, explaining: "With a film of this nature, it was quite difficult to take a call on where to place the songs. Naturally, you become a little concerned about your music affecting the mood of the film or people not responding to it well." The songs went through several improvisations to accommodate the changes in the script. The soundtrack received generally positive reviews from critics, appreciating Shyam for his work.

Release
The film released in India and Gulf Cooperation Council territories on 7 February 2019. It was released a week later in New Zealand, and two weeks later in Australia and the United Kingdom. After its theatrical run, the film premiered at the Habitat International Film Festival in Delhi on 24 May 2019, and was screened at the International Film Festival of Kerala on 613 December 2019.

Reception

Box office
The film, which was made on a budget of ₹6.5 crore, had considerable success at the box office. It grossed ₹4.8 crore from the Kerala box office and ₹3.95 crore from Gulf Cooperation Council (GCC) territories in its opening weekend. In 11 days, the film's total earnings reached ₹20 crore worldwide, of which nearly 50 per cent ticket sales came from its home state and about 45 per cent from the GCC. It ran for seven weeks in Bangalore and Chennai, six in Mumbai and Hyderabad, and five in Delhi. By the first week of April 2019, the film has made ₹27.89 crore in India. By the end of its theatrical run, the film had grossed a total of ₹39 crore worldwide.

In the overseas market, Kumbalangi Nights grossed $475,987 from 36 screens in the United Arab Emirates in its opening weekend and $1,229,943 in eight weeks. It collected $51,406 from 71 theatres in the United Kingdom in the opening weekend there. The film grossed $109,713 (₹76.4 lakh) in the United States in eight weeks. It collected NZ$35,222 (₹17.18 lakh) in New Zealand and $10,617 (₹5.34 lakh) in Australia in two weeks, as well as $38,393 (₹27.21 lakh) in Canada in three weeks.

Critical reception
The film received highly positive reviews from critics, who praised its script, cinematography, and acting performances, in particular that of Faasil and Shahir. The film appeared on many year-end and decade-end lists as one of the best Malayalam films of 2019 and the 2010s by several publications such as The Hindu, Mathrubhumi, and HuffPost India.

In a review for The Indian Express, G. Pramod Kumar called it "a subtle, but lucid and vivid poem about abandonment and redemption of human lives [...] The importance of love within the family, the brutality of patriarchy that even an eccentric man can exert, and the healing power of human touch and compassion are vividly depicted by both the writer Syam Pushakaran and director Madhu C Narayanan." Writing for Cinema Express, Sajin Shrijith lauded the film as "one of those brilliantly written, once-in-a-blue-moon films that scores in every department ... Kumbalangi Nights is not being liberal just for the sake of it—it doesn't shove its progressive ideas down our throats. It doesn't preach; it simply shows." S. R. Praveen of The Hindu concurred, writing: "Madhu. C. Narayanan has the cushion of Syam Pushkaran's perceptive and subtle writing for his directorial debut; even so he makes a mark of his own, helming the beautiful coming together of all the elements that make this film what it is." The Week's Sarath Ramesh Kuniyl agreed, rating the movie 4 stars out of 5 and deeming it "a rare gem" and a "must watch". Sify also gave a positive review, highlighting the cinematography, music and editing as "top-notch" and calling Shahir's performance "one of the finest displays of acting excellence."

A negative review came from film critic C. S. Venkiteswaran, who wrote: "In its compulsion to entertain and thrill without a pause, the narrative ends up incorporating in its stride all the clichés of the oldgen films – that of saving the damsel in distress, hero winning the heroine’s heart and body, the climactic trouncing of the villain, and the happy reunion of the family in the end – all churning up a syrupy narrative that leaves the viewers at peace with themselves and the world." Joseph Antony echoed this sentiment in his review for Outlook, opining that "the artistry of the film loses out to its political ambition [with] barely any of the invigorating spirit that makes stories interesting" and citing Faasil's performance as one of the movie's few saving graces.

The film has received polarising reviews for its depiction of mental health and counselling. The New Indian Express praised the movie for its attempt to break the stigmatisation surrounding counselling, writing, "A counselling session has many misconceptions attached to it, holding many back from reaching out to a professional. As [Saji] walks out [of a therapy session] with a light heart, another truth is demystified for the Malayali audience - that of what therapy actually involves." India Independent Films also commended the scene for being "played out subtly, and with immense respect to his state of mind ... [it] marks a watershed for depicting clinical mental health issues with the sensitivity they deserve."
However, CNBC TV18 criticised its choice of an apparently mentally unwell man as the antagonist, when his actions could have just as easily been done by a healthy person. Film critic Saibal Chatterjee pointed out that mental illness "is a disease to be treated. Instead, Shammi becomes an embodiment of all that is wrong with masculinity ... [the film is not] sensitive to the sensibilities of those suffering mental illness."

Accolades

Notes

References

External links
 

2019 films
Indian drama films
2019 directorial debut films
2019 drama films
2010s Malayalam-language films
Films about dysfunctional families
Films shot in Kochi
Films scored by Sushin Shyam
Films with screenplays by Syam Pushkaran